Kallocain is a 1940 dystopian novel by Swedish novelist Karin Boye that envisions a future of drab terror. Seen through the eyes of the idealistic scientist Leo Kall, Kallocain is a depiction of a totalitarian world state. An important aspect of the novel is the relationships and connections between the various characters, such as the marriage of the main character and his wife, Linda Kall, and the feelings of jealousy and suspicion that may arise in a society with heavy surveillance and legal uncertainty.

One of the novel's central ideas coincides with contemporary rumors of truth drugs that ensured the subordination of every citizen to the state. Both Aldous Huxley's Brave New World (1932) and Boye's Kallocain are drug dystopias, or societies in which pharmacology is used to suppress opposition to authority. However, unlike Brave New World in which a drug is used to suppress the urge to nonconformity generally, a drug in Kallocain is used to detect individual acts and thoughts of rebellion.

Kallocain has been translated into more than 10 languages; English-language translations include those by Gustaf Lannestock (2002, University of Wisconsin Press) and David McDuff (2019, Penguin Classics). It was adapted into a television miniseries in 1981 by Hans Abramson.

In 2016, the novel was nominated for the Retro-Hugo award for the best science fiction novel of 1941.

Plot 
The plot centers on Leo Kall and is written in the form of a diary or memoir. Kall lives with his wife, Linda Kall, in a city intended for chemical industry. Leo is a scientist, who is initially very loyal to the government and develops the truth drug Kallocain. It has the effect that anyone who takes it will reveal anything, even things of which they were not consciously aware.

Major themes include the notion of the self in a totalitarian state, the meaning of life, and the power of love. Another central theme is the criminalization of thoughts. Oneself is not an individual, rather a part of the state. And through the effects of Kallocain, the last sanctuary of self is invaded. Apart from the laboratory work and testing by Leo Kall, much of the novel takes place in the home of Leo and Linda.

References

Further reading
 John Hickman. "When Science Fiction Writers Used Fictional Drugs: Rise and Fall of the Twentieth-Century Drug Dystopia." Utopian Studies Vol. 20, No. 1, pp. 141–170. (2009)

External links 
 

Full text English translation  from the University of Wisconsin Digital Collections

1940 Swedish novels
Dystopian novels
1940 science fiction novels
Swedish science fiction novels
Fictional diaries
Swedish novels adapted into films
Swedish-language novels
Totalitarianism in fiction